Leek Building Society is an independent mutual building society based in Leek, Staffordshire, England. It is the 16th largest building society in the UK, based on total assets of £1,091.4m as at 31 December 2019. 
The Society has 12 branches and a Customer Service Centre across Cheshire, Derbyshire, Shropshire and Staffordshire. It is a member of the Building Societies Association.

History
The Society was established as the Leek United Permanent Benefit Building Society on 1 January 1863, under the motto ‘Firm and Lasting (as the pyramids)’. The burgeoning building society movement of the mid-19th century saw hundreds of local mutual savings and loan organisations opening up across the country, and at the time of Leek Building Society's incorporation, there were almost 3,000 building societies in existence. 
By 1883, the Society had total assets of £90,000, reserves of £5,000 and a membership of 1,328. 
It changed its name to Leek United & Midlands Building Society in 1919, and then to Leek United Building Society in 1990, before becoming Leek Building Society in 2022. Unlike many of the UK's other building societies, Leek has never grown through acquisition or merger.
In 1999, Leek Building Society was the target of a hostile takeover bid by Murray Financial Corporation, an Edinburgh-based financial group, which tabled a £30.5 million bid for the Society. It was a time when carpetbagging was rife, and the UK's remaining building societies were forced to fight for survival as opportunists sought to strip them of their mutual status and convert them into plc banks.
Although Leek Building Society's Board rejected Murray Financial's offer, Murray gained the approval of 100 of the Society's members to call a special general meeting to consider the bid. It was estimated that each of Leek's 60,000 members could gain an £800 windfall from the sale of the Society. The bid failed, however, when the Society's members rejected the offer by an almost three to one ratio.
In 2017 the Society's assets reached over £1bn.

References

Building societies of England
Banks established in 1863
Organizations established in 1863
Leek, Staffordshire
Organisations based in Staffordshire
1863 establishments in England